Jeff Beldner is an American soap opera writer.

Positions held
All My Children (hired by Agnes Nixon)
Script Editor: May 14, 2004 - January 14, 2008, March 19, 2008 – September 23, 2011
Associate Head Writer: 1994 - 1998, September 17, 2001 - May 2004
Script Writer: 1991 - 1994
Writer's Assistant: 1990 - 1991

As the World Turns (hired by Lorraine Broderick)
Breakdown Writer (1998 - August 20, 2001)

The Young and the Restless (hired by Maria Arena Bell)
Breakdown Writer: July 13, 2012 – Present

Awards and nominations
Daytime Emmy NOMINATIONS (1992 & 1993, 1995, 2002–2004; Best Writing; All My Children)
Daytime Emmy WINS (2001 & 2002; Best Writing; As the World Turns)
Daytime Emmy NOMINATION (2000; Best Writing; As the World Turns)
Daytime Emmy WINS (1996–1998; Best Writing; All My Children)
Writers Guild of America Award WINS (For 1996, 1997 & 2003 Season; All My Children)
Writers Guild of America Award NOMINATION (For 1998 Season; As the World Turns)
Writers Guild of America Award NOMINATION (For 1995 Season; All My Children)

External links

American soap opera writers
American male television writers
Living people
Year of birth missing (living people)